Britannia is a designated place in the Canadian province of Newfoundland and Labrador. It is on Trinity Bay and is part of the local service district of Random Island West.

Geography 
Britannia is in Newfoundland within Subdivision L of Division No. 7.

Demographics 

See also 
List of communities in Newfoundland and Labrador
List of designated places in Newfoundland and Labrador

References 

Designated places in Newfoundland and Labrador